Ignacio Agramonte International Airport  is an international airport in central Camagüey Province, Cuba. It serves the city of Camagüey and the resort village of Santa Lucía.

History
During World War II, the airport was used by the United States Army Air Forces Sixth Air Force from 1942 until 1944. The 25th Bombardment Group 417th Bombardment Squadron flew B-18 Bolo bombers from the airfield, known as Camaguey Air Base, from 13 April 1942 though August 1943. The squadron flew antisubmarine missions over the northern Caribbean. The base was also used for air-sea rescue missions by the 1st Rescue Squadron.

From 1 January 1943, the USAAF set up postal operations for Camaguey using Army Post Office, Miami with the address: 2714 APO MIA. The United States Navy also set up to use a non-descript number for postal operations. They used the Fleet Post Office, Atlantic located in New York City with the address: 617 FPO NY.

The airport was closed from March to October 2020 due to the COVID-19 pandemic.

Airlines and destinations

Camagüey Air Base
The airport is an inactive Cuban Revolutionary Armed Forces air base:

 3685th Regiment
 2 General purpose transport squadron - Mil Mi-17 helicopters

References

External links

camaguey.airportcuba.net Complete information about Camagüey airport 

Airports in Cuba
Buildings and structures in Camagüey
Buildings and structures in Camagüey Province